Franz Konwitschny (14 August 1901, Fulnek, Moravia – 28 July 1962, Belgrade) was a German conductor and violist of Moravian descent.

He started his career on the viola, playing in the Leipzig Gewandhaus Orchestra under Wilhelm Furtwängler. In 1925, he moved to Vienna, where he played the viola with the Fitzner Quartet. He also began teaching at the Wiener Volkskonservatorium. He later became a conductor, joining the Stuttgart Opera in 1927. From 1949 until his death he was principal conductor of the Leipzig Gewandhaus Orchestra. From 1953 until 1955 he was also principal conductor of the Dresden Staatskapelle and from 1955 onward he led the Berlin State Opera.

Like Furtwängler, Konwitschny used "expansive gestures" and had a "dislike of an exact beat." Konwitschny recorded a complete cycle of Beethoven symphonies.

He was given the nickname Kon-whisky because of his heavy drinking habits.

His first marriage to Maria Wilhelmine Josephine Hambloch (Gieser) produced two children, Franziska Hinzte (née Konwitschny) and Dieter Konwitschny.  
His son from his second marriage Peter Konwitschny is a leading opera director in Germany.

Recordings

Wagner, Tristan und Isolde, Ludwig Suthaus, Gottlob Frick, Margarete Bäumer, Karl Wolfram, Erna Westenberger – Franz Konwitschny, conductor: Leipzig Gewandhaus Orchestra, 21-23.10.1950 (Walhall Eternity Series WLCD 0118)
Wagner, Tannhäuser, Hans Hopf, Gottlob Frick, Dietrich Fischer-Dieskau, Elisabeth Grümmer – Franz Konwitschny, conductor: Staatskapelle Berlin. Chor der Berliner Staatsoper, Recorded in October 1960
Wagner, Der fliegende Holländer Dietrich Fischer-Dieskau, Marianne Schech, Rudolf Schock, Gottlob Frick, Fritz Wunderlich - Franz Konwitschny, conductor: Staatskapelle Berlin. Chor der Deutschen Staatsoper Berlin 1960

References 

 
 Wolfram Schwinger, "Konwitschny, Franz" in The New Grove Dictionary of Music and Musicians edited by Stanley Sadie, volume 13,

External links 

 František Sláma (musician) Archive . More on the history of the Czech Philharmonic between the 1940s and the 1980s: Conductors

1901 births
1962 deaths
People from Fulnek
German male conductors (music)
Music directors (opera)
German people of Moravian-German descent
Music directors of the Berlin State Opera
Moravian-German people
20th-century German conductors (music)
20th-century German male musicians